Shang Jincai is a Chinese cross-country skier who competes internationally.
 
He represented his country at the 2022 Winter Olympics.

Cross-country skiing results
All results are sourced from the International Ski Federation (FIS).

Olympic Games

Distance reduced to 30 km due to weather conditions.

World Championships

World Cup

Season standings

References

Living people
1993 births
Chinese male cross-country skiers
Olympic cross-country skiers of China
Cross-country skiers at the 2022 Winter Olympics
Cross-country skiers at the 2017 Asian Winter Games